Hermenias is a genus of moths belonging to the subfamily Olethreutinae of the family Tortricidae.

Species
Hermenias dnophera Dianokoff, 1983
Hermenias epidola Meyrick, 1911
Hermenias pachnitis Meyrick, 1912
Hermenias pilushina Razowski, 2000
Hermenias rivulifera Turner, 1946
Hermenias semicurva (Meyrick, 1912)
Hermenias zygodelta Meyrick, 1938

See also
List of Tortricidae genera

References

External links
tortricidae.com

Eucosmini
Tortricidae genera
Taxa named by Edward Meyrick